Violet identifies various plant taxa, particularly species in the genus Viola, within which the common violet is the best known member in Eurasia and the common blue violet and common purple violet are the best known members in North America, but also:

 Various species of Barleria, including:
 Barleria cristata, Philippine violet
 Barleria obtusa, bush violet
 Barleria repens, small bush violet
 Browallia, bush violets
 Erythronium, dog's tooth violets
 Exacum affine, Persian violet
 Hesperis matronalis, damask violet, dame's violet
 Hottonia palustris, water violet
 Streptocarpus sect. Saintpaulia, African violets
 Telosma cordata, Chinese violet

See also
 Securidaca longipedunculata, violet tree